Danesh or Danish (دانش) is a Persian word which literally translates to "knowledge", "science" and "wisdom". It is a popular Muslim name in the Indian subcontinent.

Notable people with the name include:

Given name

Film and television
 Danish Taimoor (born 1983), Pakistani actor and model
 Danish Nawaz (born 1978), Pakistani director, comedian and actor
 Danish Pandor, Indian actor in Agent Raghav – Crime Branch

Journalism
 Danish Karokhel, Afghan journalist, director of Pajhwok Afghan News agency
 Danish Siddiqui (1980–2021), Indian photojournalist, killed in Afghanistan

Sport
 Danish Kaneria, Pakistani cricketer
 Danish Atlas Khan, Pakistani squash player
 Danish Mujtaba, Indian field hockey player

Other
 Daniş Tunalıgil, Turkish diplomat

Surname
 Agha Danish, Pakistani naval officer
 Davoud Danesh-Jafari, Iranian economist
 Haji Mohammad Danesh, Bangladeshi politician 
 Ihsan Danish (1915–1982), Pakistani poet
 Noon Meem Danish (born 1958), Pakistani poet
 Sarwar Danish (born 1961), Afghan politician
 Tyler Danish (born 1994), American professional baseball pitcher for the Boston Red Sox of Major League Baseball (MLB)

See also
 Danishmend, Turcoman dynasty 
 The ship Empire Sally was renamed Danesh

Iranian masculine given names
Pakistani masculine given names